Robin Dahse (born April 30, 1992) is a Swedish  professional ice hockey player. He plays with Sparta Warriors in the Norwegian GET-ligaen.

References

External links

1992 births
Living people
Frölunda HC players
Malmö Redhawks players
Sparta Warriors players
Swedish ice hockey forwards
Växjö Lakers players
Sportspeople from Malmö